The Society for Mathematics and Computation in Music (SMCM) was founded in 2006 as an International Forum for researchers and musicians working in the trans-disciplinary field at the intersection of music, mathematics and computation. The SMCM is registered in the USA. At its inaugural meeting in Berlin on May 20, 2007, 13 board members were elected. The board later elected the officers for the society.

Officers
President: Guerino Mazzola, University of Minnesota

Vice President: Moreno Andreatta, IRCAM/CNRS, Paris

Treasurer: David Clampitt, Ohio State University

Secretary: Johanna Devaney, Ohio State University

Past Officers
Treasurer (2007-2013): Ian Quinn, Yale University

Secretary (2007-2013): Elaine Chew, University of Southern California / Queen Mary University of London

Conferences
The Society hosts a biennial meeting, the International Conference on Mathematics and Computation in Music (MCM). 
 MCM 2007, National Institute for Music Research, Berlin, Germany, May 18–20, 2007
 MCM 2009, Yale University, New Haven, Connecticut, USA, June 19–22, 2009 
 MCM 2011, IRCAM, Paris, France, June 15–17, 2011 
 MCM 2013, McGill University Schulich School of Music and CIRMMT, Montreal, Canada, June 12–14, 2013
 MCM 2015, Queen Mary University of London, London, United Kingdom, June 22–25, 2015
 MCM 2017, MCM 2017, Universidad Nacional Autónoma di México (UNAM), Mexico City, Mexico, June 26–29, 2017

Journals
SMCM’s official journal is the Journal of Mathematics and Music.

See also
 Music and mathematics
 List of music software

External links
 SMCM Official website: http://www.smcm-net.info/
 SMCM Official Journal: http://www.tandfonline.com/loi/tmam20

References

Music organizations based in the United States
Mathematical societies